Kuchela ( Devotee Kuchela) is a 1936 Indian devotional film in Tamil language directed and produced by lawyer turned filmmaker K. Subramaniam. The film featured Papanasam Sivan as Kuchela and S. D. Subbulakshmi in dual roles as Lord Krishna and Kuchela's wife Susheela.

Plot 
The film depicted the tale of friendship between the poor Brahmin Kuchela who had 27 children and Lord Krishna.

Cast 
The following list was adapted from The Hindu review article by Randor Guy and from the film's song book.

Male cast
Papanasam Sivan as Kuchela
Vidwan Shankaralingam as Balaraman
S. S. Mani Bhagavathar as Saandheepa Muni
Jolly Kittu as Dwarapaalakar
G. Pattu Iyer as Samba Moorthi
Kunjithapatham Pillai as Vevukaar
Salem Sundaram as Rich Mirasudar

Female cast
S. D. Subbulakshmi as Lord Krishna and Suseelai
K. K. Parvathi as Rukmini
Poornima as Sathyabhama
Bala Saraswathi as Young Krishnan
Neelambal as Young Kuchela

Production 
Subramanyam cast Subbulakshmi in a double role as a male (Lord Krishna) and a female (Susheela, Kuchela's wife). Such casting was the first of its kind in Tamil film history and even Indian cinema. Cinematography was handled by Sailen Bose and the continuity (Editing) was supervised by G. Pattu Iyer.

Title 
The Encyclopedia of Indian cinema and The Hindu review article gives the title of the film as Bhaktha Kuchela. Whereas, Film News Anandan's database and the Song Book gives the title as Kuchela.

Soundtrack 
The music was composed by Papanasam Sivan who also penned the lyrics. There were more than 30 songs in the film. The song book gave the details of orchestra.
Parthasarathy Naidu – Harmonium
Rajam Iyer – Fiddle (Violin)
Ekambara Achari – Mridangam

Reception 
Writing in 2010, Randor Guy said the film was a success. He said the film is "Remembered for the innovative casting, pleasing music and Subbulakshmi's performance."

References

External links 
 - A rare duet by Papanasam Sivan and S. D. Subbulakshmi from this film.

1936 films
1930s Tamil-language films
Hindu devotional films
Hindu mythological films
Indian black-and-white films
Films directed by K. Subramanyam
Films scored by Papanasam Sivan